{{Infobox settlement

| official_name          = East Kolaka Regency
| native_name            = Kabupaten Kolaka Timur
| native_name_lang       = id
| image_skyline          =
| image_alt              = 
| image_caption          = 
| type                   = Regency
| image_shield             = Lambang Kabupaten Kolaka Timur.png
| shield_alt               = 
| motto                  = Inae Konasara Iye Pinesara Inae Liasara Iye Pinekasara
| image_map              = 
| map_alt                = 
| map_caption            = Location within Southeast Sulawesi
| coordinates            = 
| coordinates_footnotes  =
| subdivision_type       = Country
| subdivision_name       = Indonesia
| subdivision_type1      = Province
| subdivision_name1      = Southeast Sulawesi
| seat_type              = Capital
| seat                   = Tirawuta
| leader_title           = Regent (Bupati)
| leader_name            = Abdul Aziz. SH
| leader_title1 = Vice Regent
| leader_name1 = 
| area_footnotes         = 
| area_total_km2         = 3999.74	
| elevation_min_m        = 	
| elevation_max_m        = 
| elevation_m            = 
| population_as_of       = 2022 
| population_total       = 125311
| population_density_km2 = auto
| population_footnotes   = 
| timezone1              = ICST
| utc_offset1            = +8
| website                = 
| footnotes              = 
| pushpin_map = Indonesia_Sulawesi#Indonesia
| pushpin_map_caption = Location in Sulawesi and Indonesia
| pushpin_label_position = left
| postal_code_type = Postcode
| postal_code = 93573
| area_code_type = Area code
| area_code = (+62) 405
}}
The East Kolaka Regency is a new and the only landlocked regency of Southeast Sulawesi, Indonesia, established in 2013 from the former eastern nine districts of the Kolaka Regency. The administrative centre lies at Tirawuta; its current Regent is Andi Merya Nur. The area is 3,634.74 km2, and the population at the 2020 census was 120,699.

 Administration 
On 14 December 2012, the Indonesian Parliament approved the establishment of a new East Kolaka Regency (Kolaka Timur), to be split off from the existing Kolaka Regency; the new regency - which came into effect in 2013 under Law No. 8 of 2013 - comprised nine districts of the existing Kolaka Regency; subsequently an additional three districts have been created by splitting existing districts. These are detailed below with their areas and their populations at the 2010 census and the 2020 census. The districts are subdivided into 133 villages (rural desa and urban kelurahan'').

Notes: (a) the 2010 population of Aere District is included in the figure for Lambandia District, from which it was subsequently split off. (b) the 2010 population of Dangia District is included in the figure for Ladongi District, from which it was subsequently split off. (c) the 2010 population of Ueesi District is included in the figure for Uluiwoi District, from which it was subsequently split off.

References

External links
 

Regencies of Southeast Sulawesi